Lennart Lindberg (1918–2004) was a Swedish stage and film actor.  He was married to the actress Barbro Larsson in the 1950s.

Selected filmography
 Customs Officer Bom (1951)
 Beef and the Banana (1951)
 U-Boat 39 (1952)
 Blondie, Beef and the Banana (1952)
 Unmarried Mothers (1953)
 Bread of Love (1953)
 Young Summer (1954)
 Men in the Dark (1955)
 The Dance Hall (1955)
 The Girl in Tails (1956)
 The Lady in Black (1958)
 Åsa-Nisse in Military Uniform (1958)
 Rider in Blue (1959)
 A Matter of Morals (1961)
 Sailors (1964)

References

Bibliography
 Steene, Birgitta. Ingmar Bergman: A Reference Guide. Amsterdam University Press, 2005.
 Wright, Rochelle. The Visible Wall: Jews and Other Ethnic Outsiders in Swedish Film. SIU Press, 1998.

External links

1918 births
2004 deaths
Swedish male film actors
Swedish male stage actors
20th-century Swedish male actors
Male actors from Stockholm